HomeServices of America is the nation's largest residential real estate services company, based on closed transactions. The company provides real estate brokerage services, mortgage loan origination, franchising, title insurance/escrow and closing services, home warranties, property insurance, casualty insurance, and relocation services.

The company's real estate brokerage division operates under 43 brand names, which can be found on the company's website, www.homeservices.com .

History
The company traces its roots to Amerus Home Services Inc.

In 1998, Amerus Home Services was acquired by MidAmerican Energy Holdings Company.

In 1999, MidAmerican renamed its brokerage business HomeServices and acquired Semonin Realtors, operating in Louisville, and Long Realty, operating in Arizona. 

In 1999, Berkshire Hathaway acquired MidAmerican Energy Holdings Company.

In 2006, the company acquired Atlanta based real estate brokerage Harry Norman, Realtors®.

In 2012, the company acquired real estate brokerage firms from Prudential and Real Living and rebranded Prudential Real Estate to Berkshire Hathaway HomeServices.

In August 2013, the company acquired Prudential Fox & Roach, Realtors®/Trident Group.

In November 2013, the company acquired Prudential Rubloff Properties, operating in the Chicago area.

In May 2014, the company acquired Intero Real Estate Services, operating in Silicon Valley.

In July 2015, the company acquired Prudential Centennial Realty, operating in Westchester County, and First Weber, the largest residential brokerage in Wisconsin.

In January 2017, the company acquired Houlihan Lawrence, the largest residential brokerage in Westchester County.

In April 2017, the company acquired Gloria Nilson & Co. Real Estate, a residential brokerage in New Jersey. The company also formed a strategic alliance with Juwai.com, China's largest overseas property portal offering access to high-net-worth individual Chinese buyers looking to purchase homes.

In June 2017, Robert Moline, president of the company, retired.

In September 2017, the company acquired Long & Foster.

In 2018, the company acquired North Texas real estate firm Ebby Halliday.

In 2020, they originated 43,683 mortgages with a value of $13.8 billion.

In 2022, through its Edina Realty subsidiary acquired Sioux Falls, South Dakota based Hegg Realtors

References

Real estate services companies of the United States
Companies based in Minneapolis
Financial services companies established in 1998
Real estate companies established in 1998
Berkshire Hathaway
American real estate websites
Property management companies